Choachí is a municipality and town of Colombia in the Eastern Province of the department of Cundinamarca. The municipality borders La Calera in the north, Ubaque in the south, in the east Fómeque and westward of Choachí is the Colombian capital Bogotá. Within the boundaries of Choachí the Páramo de Cruz Verde is situated.

Etymology 
The name Choachí is derived from the original name in Chibcha: Chi-gua-chí, which means "Our Mountain of the Moon". The Muisca had a strong lunar cult and worshipped the goddess of the Moon, Chía in various places across their territories. It is believed that in Choachí a place of worship to the Moon was located.

History 
The area of Choachí was inhabited by the southern Muisca, part of the Muisca Confederation ruled by the zipa of Bacatá. The modern foundation of the town was early in the Spanish conquest of the Muisca, in 1560, by Antonio Bermúdez, a conquistador who arrived as part of the army of Gonzalo Jiménez de Quesada. In 1601 a parish was constructed in Choachí.

Between the 17th and 19th century the original indigenous population almost completely perished.

Economy 
Main economical activities in Choachí are agriculture, livestock farming.  Also tourism, mainly from the capital, is a source of income for the local people.

Geology 
In the area of Choachí Cretaceous sandstones and the organic-rich shales of the Fómeque Formation are outcropping.

Archeology 
In the first half of the 20th century within Choachí the Choachí Stone has been found, possibly in a grave. The stone, carved in lydite may represent the Muisca calendar, a complex lunisolar calendar used by the Muisca. Also petroglyphs have been discovered in Choachí.

Gallery

Trivia 
 A number of episodes of the popular series Escobar, el patrón del mal were filmed in Choachí

References

Bibliography

External links 

  Petroglyhs discovered in Choachí - accessed 29-04-2016

Municipalities of Cundinamarca Department
Populated places established in 1560
1560 establishments in the Spanish Empire
Muisca Confederation
Muysccubun